Lynnwood Transit Center, also known as Lynnwood TC or LTC, is a bus station and future light rail station in Lynnwood, Washington. It is the largest transit hub in southwestern Snohomish County and is served by Community Transit and Sound Transit Express. The transit center also includes a park and ride with 1,370 spaces and bicycle facilities.

In 2024, Lynnwood Transit Center will become the northern terminus of Sound Transit's Link Light Rail system as part of the Lynnwood Link Extension. The Link extension was approved in 2008 as part of the Sound Transit 2 ballot measure.

Location and layout

The Lynnwood Transit Center is located on the north side of Interstate 5 at 44th Avenue West, southwest of Alderwood Mall in Lynnwood. The  transit center includes 20 bus bays and a 1,370-stall park and ride across three surface lots. The bus bays have passenger information displays that have real-time arrival information for inbound buses. A customer service center called "RideStore" is located at the north end of the transit center.

The transit center is also located adjacent to the Interurban Trail, which runs through the southeast parking lot and connects it to Alderwood Mall, Aurora Village and downtown Everett.

The 2003 renovation of the transit center came with the installation of two pieces of public artwork created by Claudia Fitch, known collectively as Shift. The art installation consists of a pair of  steel beacons resembling newel posts that are used to mark the two main crosswalks.

History

Planning for a large park and ride lot in Lynnwood began in the late 1970s with the formation of Community Transit and increasing population growth in Lynnwood that had begun to affect the nearby Northgate lot. Construction on  lot began in February 1980, with the project's $1.5 million cost paid for almost entirely by the Federal Highway Administration. The park and ride opened on May 25, 1981, with 808 stalls, becoming the largest park and ride in the state of Washington, serving Community Transit as well as Seattle-bound commuter buses operated by King County Metro.

In September 2003, Sound Transit and Community Transit rebuilt the park and ride lot and renamed it "Lynnwood Transit Center". The following year, a $31.2 million direct access ramp to Interstate 5's high-occupancy vehicle lanes, the first in the state, was opened to replace the congested onramp on 44th Avenue West.

Light rail construction

Lynnwood Transit Center was selected as the northern terminus of the Lynnwood Link Extension, a  light rail extension that is part of the Link light rail system. The extension and its $1.6 billion in funding was approved by voters in 2008. When it opens in 2024, the extension is projected to carry 63,000 to 74,000 daily riders by 2035; 17,900 daily riders are expected to board at Lynnwood Transit Center's station.

The station will have two entrances connected to its mezzanine below platform level: one that travels across the roadway and leads to a ground-level plaza; and another with direct access to a five-story parking garage with 500 stalls. The existing bus station would be retained and slightly expanded to accommodate more layover space. Parking at the transit center would increase to 1,900 stalls, with room to expand further.

Construction of the station will require the demolition of a furniture store to the east of the bus bays, a well as a gas station, restaurant and strip mall. Demolition of the stores began in July 2018 and the project broke ground in September 2019. In early 2020, Sound Transit opened a temporary parking lot on the east side of 46th Avenue West to replace several closed areas of the park and ride that will be used for construction staging. Construction on the five-story parking garage began in October 2020.

Sound Transit determined in 2011 that the area around the transit center had "moderate to strong" potential for transit-oriented development, including housing and offices. The area around the transit center is part of a regional growth center designated by the Puget Sound Regional Council; the Lynnwood city government designated the area between the transit center and the Alderwood Mall to the northeast as its city center, preparing for heavy development that is expected to follow light rail expansion.

Services

, more than 40 percent of Community Transit's bus routes serve the transit center, with 500 total buses passing through each day. Buses arrive at Lynnwood Transit Center at an average frequency of every three minutes during peak periods.

Bus routes

References

External links
Lynnwood Link Extension
Lynnwood Transit Center/Park-and-Ride

1981 establishments in Washington (state)
Future Link light rail stations
Transportation buildings and structures in Snohomish County, Washington
Lynnwood, Washington
Railway stations scheduled to open in 2024
Bus stations in Washington (state)
Sound Transit Express